The Hungarian People's Party of Transylvania is a political party representing the Hungarian minority in Romania. It was founded in 2011.

Ideology and objectives 

It positions itself as an alternative for the Hungarian minority in Romania to the Democratic Alliance of Hungarians in Romania (UDMR/RMDSZ), the largest party representing the Hungarians/Magyars living in Romania. The party's aim is "to establish an own parliament and government in Transylvania" and to achieve autonomy for the Szeklerland. It also advocates territorial autonomy for Partium. 

In June 2014, Tibor Toró made a proposal for the revision of the bilateral treaty between Romania and Hungary, which was signed in 1996: I think the basic treaty with Hungary should be amended to introduce a reference to the possibility of creating the legal framework of autonomy for national communities, specifically for Hungarians.

This political organization is closely associated with the European MP László Tőkés, who was described by the president Tibor Toró as "the mentor of the party".

In August 2021, the party proposed a similar law to the Hungarian anti-LGBT law.

Electoral history

Legislative elections

Presidential elections

See also 

 Hungarians in Romania
 Székely autonomy movement

References 

2011 establishments in Romania
Christian democratic parties in Europe
Conservative parties in Romania
European Free Alliance
Hungarian organizations in Romania
Political parties established in 2011
Regionalist parties in Romania
Registered political parties in Romania
Hungarian political parties in Romania